Robinson Newspapers is a group of community weekly newspapers that served several neighborhoods and towns in King County, Washington.
The newspapers cover the neighborhoods of Ballard and West Seattle within the City of Seattle. Outside of Seattle, they cover White Center, Burien, and the greater Highline area south of Seattle to the communities of Des Moines, and SeaTac. In 2013 the newspapers were merged into a single print publication called the Westside Weekly though the individual newspaper "flags" or brands are within sections of the printed product. Each newspaper still operates online individually.

History 

The company is owned by the Robinson family. Its founder was Jerry Robinson (1920-2014). Robinson purchased the White Center News in 1952, founded the Federal Way News in 1954, expanding it into Des Moines in 1963. He acquired the Highline Times and the West Seattle Herald in 1974. With his partner Al Sneed, he developed Rotary Offset Publishing Company in 1956, installing the first web offset style rotary printing press west of the Mississippi River. Robinson sold the papers in 1989 but restarted them in 1998 after then publisher ceased operations. He had previously acquired the Ballard News Tribune and the Monroe Monitor in 1993.

Today the company is operated by sons Ken and Tim Robinson as Managing Editor and General Manager respectively. Another son, Patrick, is the online editor for  WestSeattleHerald.com, as well as functioning as a reporter/photographer and social media manager. Son Scott Robinson is a contributing columnist.

Newspapers
Ballard News-Tribune
Des Moines News
Highline Times
White Center News
West Seattle Herald

External links
Robinson Newspapers

Newspapers published in Washington (state)